The 1993 USA Outdoor Track and Field Championships took place between June 16–19 at Hayward Field in Eugene, Oregon. This was the first USA Outdoor Track and Field Championships organized by the newly named USA Track and Field (USATF). The competition acted as a way of selecting the United States team for the 1993 World Championships in Athletics in Stuttgart, Germany August 13–22 later that year.

Results

Men track events

Men field events

Women track events

Women field events

See also
United States Olympic Trials (track and field)

References

 Results from T&FN
 results

USA Outdoor Track and Field Championships
Usa Outdoor Track And Field Championships, 1999
Track and field
Sports in Eugene, Oregon
1993 in sports in Oregon
Track and field in Oregon